Preussia is a genus of fungi in the family Sporormiaceae. The widespread genus contains 51 species that grow on dung or in the soil.

The genus name of Preussia is in honour of Carl Gottlieb Traugott Preuss (1795-1855), who was a German (Prussian) botanist (Algology and
Mykology) and Apothecary. He was from 1834 - 1855 an Apothecary in Hoyerswerda. 
 
The genus was circumscribed by Karl Wilhelm Gottlieb Leopold Fuckel in Hedwigia vol.6 on page 175 in 1867 and previously in Linnaea vol.24 on page 143 in 1851.

Species
As accepted by Species Fungorum;

Preussia aemulans 
Preussia africana 
Preussia alloiomera 
Preussia alpina 
Preussia americana 
Preussia antarctica 
Preussia aquilirostrata 
Preussia bipartis 
Preussia borealis 
Preussia calomera 
Preussia citrullina 
Preussia clavispora 
Preussia commutata 
Preussia constricta 
Preussia cymatomera 
Preussia dubia 
Preussia flanaganii 
Preussia fleischhakii 
Preussia funiculata 
Preussia globosa 
Preussia hexaphragmia 
Preussia immersa 
Preussia inaequalis 
Preussia isabellae 
Preussia isomera 
Preussia lasiocarpa 
Preussia lignicola 
Preussia longispora 
Preussia longisporopsis 
Preussia mediterranea 
Preussia minipascua 
Preussia minipolymera 
Preussia obliqua 
Preussia octocylindrospora 
Preussia octomera 
Preussia peltigerae 
Preussia persica 
Preussia polymorpha 
Preussia pyriformis 
Preussia quattuordecimcellularis 
Preussia scandinavica 
Preussia splendens 
Preussia sultanii 
Preussia systenospora 
Preussia tenerifae 
Preussia terricola 
Preussia tetramera 
Preussia typharum 
Preussia variispora 
Preussia vulgaris

References

Pleosporales
Taxa named by Karl Wilhelm Gottlieb Leopold Fuckel
Taxa described in 1867